Ntezi is located in the eastern outskirt of Ishielu LGA of Ebonyi State in Nigeria. Ntezi is pronounced Eh-teh-ji (Eteji) by the natives, and belongs to the Orring, Oring or Orri People. The dialect of Ntezi is K'eteji with the attached 'k' prefix given the name Keteji, a sub-language of korring spoken by Orring people in their diverse dialects across their settlements in Nigeria and Cameroon.

Ntezi is an Orring sub-ethnic group. The Orring people occupy a scattered heterogeneous territories coexisting in three states in Nigeria which are Benue, Cross River and Ebonyi States. Orring people are the aboriginal Abakaliki people settling in the town of Ntezi-Aba living alongside their Mbembe and Ekoi neighbours prior to the coming of the later Abakaliki group. The Orring people are proxy to their neighbours, and this proximity has over the years, led to some intergroup relationship through marriage, beliefs and cultural exchanges resulting to creation of a mixed civilizations that resulted to the number of differences among the aborigines. This is the case of linguistical and cultural evidence among people.

Location 
Ntezi is located in eastern part of Ishielu LGA, in Ebonyi state, Nigeria. The present settlements of Orring People of Ebonyi State are: Ntezi and Okpoto as found in Ishielu LGA, Effium in Ohaukwu, and Amuda and Okpomoro in the southern part of Ohaukwu, Ntezi is borderd in the North by Ngbo, in the South by Ezza, East and West by Ezzamgbo and Ezillo, respectively.

Villages 
Ntezi has five Oring speaking villages namely: Agaga, Ulepa, Iyokpa, Amata and Biledeba. These villages are further made up of various hamlets, lineages called Lèmá and farm settlements; there are also two villages of Umuezeka and Umuezekoha settlements at the outskirts to the southwest and Southeast of Ntezi respectively.

Industry and Market 
Ntezi people are known to be skilled crafters, with basket-making a notable occupation among the people. Aside farming and agriculture, trading is another important economic activity of Ntezi, with a relatively large and very busy Ode market which hold once every four Igbo market days. Ode Ntezi is a modern market located in Ntezi community. A rural area in Ishielu LGA of Ebonyi State, Nigeria.

Ode drew its name from the Igbo 'orie' market. Koring dialect seems to be a sub dialectical blend of Igbo though very strong due to the presence of non-Igbo speaking groups prior to State system in Nigeria which was purely responsible for the presence of misconception among scholars today.

Ode market is as old as Ntezi itself. Oral history holds that trade routes were established in the olden days to link up Ụbụrụ salt factory, with northern Igbo and Idoma traders. Ode Ntezi as it is commonly known by traders and visitors is a point for trading various wares and agricultural produce. Presently, the market is emerging as the biggest basket market in Nigeria.

Ntezi community where the market is found speak Korring, a sub-Bantu language spoken in northern Cross River and also in Taraba and Benue states, Nigeria. The language is believed to be descendent from the ancient Kwararafa confederation. Ntezi and other Korring speaking people in Ebonyi State occupied the entire Abakaliki region prior to the coming of the Igbo speaking people.

However, after centuries of transcultural relations with the Igbo people, Orring people are mostly integrated with Igbos in every aspect of their sociocultural lives. Hence, the Orring of Ebonyi are often considered to be Igbos. This scenario actually hinders relationships with other Orring and Ukelle groups who do not identify as Igbos.

History 

Ntezi is an Orring community. Orring People are the aboriginal Abakaliki people who founded Abakaliki and settled at Ntezi-Aba (Eteji-Aba) prior to the coming of the  later Abakaliki people. Orring people are mainly found in states within the three geopolitical zones of Nigeria. In Ebonyi state, the Orring people are the Effium and Amuda-Effium people in Ohaukwu LGA; Ntezi and Okpoto in Ishielu LGA; Amuda and Okpomoro in Ezza North LGA. In Cross River state, they are the Ukelle group among who are the Wanikom, Wanikade, Itrigon, Uzekwe, Wanokum in Yala LGA,  and the Ba'humono people in Abi LGA. In Benue state, there are also the Ufia (Utonkon) people found in Ado LGA making up more than the half population of Ado LGA in Benue state. The Orring people are not linguistically and culturally distinct from the Ukelle people . The Kukelle and Korring languages may be considered as dialect groups of the same language family, however scholars have suggested that it could possibly be a breakaway of one of the Igbiod dialects of the Niger-Cross Language family, which Igbo language forms a part. This is particularly as a result of the common names and terms among the Igbo hearthands and the Orring people.

The history of the Orring people is sketchy, however some speculate that Orring descend from the kwararafa kingdom before The amalgamation of Nigeria. However, oral tradition deems that Orring settled in present-day Ebonyi State prior to the coming of the Igboid sub-tribes of Ezza, Izzi, Ikwo and Ngbo whose progenitors migrated from the southern Igbo and Ibibio kingdoms of Aro, Afikpo, Edda, Nkwa, Abak and Ohafia. This assertion is supported by historical documents of Abakaliki People by Abakaliki scholars.  The present fragmentation of and dispersal of Orring settlements is due to years of intertribal wars. The Orring people were once settled in contiguous territories including the Ba'kelle, Uffia, Ba'humono before being dislodged and separated by invading groups.

Orring people are also found in Yala LGA (as Ukelle or  Ba'kelle) and Abi LGA (as Ba'humono) of Cross River and also in Ado LGA (as Utonkon or Uffia) of Benue state boarder respectively. It is probable that while some Orring people were the early inhabitants of the Enugu-Abakaliki region and the upper Cross River in present-day South Eastern Nigeria, there was further migration of the Orring group from the Kwararafa federation due to the rise of Queen Amina and the subsequent Fulani jihads.

Prior to Colonialism, to Nigeria Civil War, down to the present period, the Orring people of Ebonyi state simply identify with their counterparts as Igbo, bearing Igbo names and terms, cultural values, linguistical connectivity, and other identity factors. Orring to the average Orring person simply refer themselves as Igbo, and strongly maintain Igbiod personality across anywhere they found themselves.

Ntezi people are known for their masquerade festival known as "Oviode" a chief deity celebrated once every year after the showcase of the full moon within late January and early February, it is a very important celebration observed by the five villages of Ntezi. Oviode festival attracts tourists during the celebrations,  and also witnessed by Ezillo and Ezzamgbo neighbours of the Ovi-Obotto deity. There are other Cultural festivals, but Oviode is the most popular. It usually hold after the five villages have summed their own individual celebrations which is peculiar to the individual villages that makes up Ntezi community.

Language 
The language of Orring people is Korring which is further group dialectically according individual communities and clans of the Orring people.

According A.E. Afigbo and A.I. Alagoa in Obaro Ikeme's "Groundwork of Nigerian History", K'orring is classified understand the Benue Congo language family. While Greenberg classified K'orring language family as part of the Bantiod languages of the Cross River and Benue Congo language family which Igbo language forms a part. This claim was further backup by the writings of Nnamdi, a historian from the department of History and International Relations in Ebonyi State University; and Offorka from the department of Linguistics in University of Nigerian Nsukka that came up with a concise agreement stating some fact and semantic relationship of Korring language and Bantu. Chief discovery of this assumption centers on the language similarities with the bantiod "Kwararafa empire" which stretched from the Benue river far to the Cameron mountain. For instance, Bantu means 'the people'. This is the root of the Korring word for people called 'banuo (gbanuo)' and the Kukelle word ballot. Such similarities support the works of Greenberg in classification of Cross-River languages.

The Kins of Ntezi in Ebonyi are Okpoto (Lame) in Ishielu LGA, Amuda (Idzem) and Okpomoro (Okpolo) in Ezza North LGA, and Effium (Uffium) in Ohaukwu LGA. Ntezi also have kins in Benue State, which are the Ogbia, Ufia and Utonkon; and in Cross River State are the Ukele, Wanikom, Wanikom, Izekwe, Wanikade, Akunakwina, among others. The Ukele speak a Korring dialect called Kukele (k'ukele), while Ufia of Benue speaks Kufia (k'ufia), K'idzem for Amuda natively called 'Idzem', and Kuffium for the Effium natively called 'Uffium'.

References 

 "Ntezi Archives". The Guardian Nigeria News - Nigeria and World News. Retrieved 2021-06-09.

Igbo language
Populated places in Ebonyi State